Prince of Peace Catholic School is a Catholic high school in Clinton, Iowa, United States.  It is located in the Roman Catholic Diocese of Davenport.

It was previously known as Mater Dei High School, St. Mary's High School, and Mount Saint Clare Academy.  It is a parochial school under the Clinton Prince of Peace parish.

Activities
The school has a band, chorus, quiz bowl, yearbook, newspaper and student council.

Athletics
Prince of Peace is a class 1A school with sports teams participating in the Tri-Rivers athletic conference. Its team is named the Irish.

Sports that the Irish participate in include Cross country, Basketball, Track, Soccer, Golf, Baseball, Softball, and Volleyball.
 3-time Class 1A State Champions in Volleyball (1981, 1982, 1983)

Notable alumni
Tom Hilgendorf - former Major League Baseball pitcher for St. Louis Cardinals, Cleveland Indians, Philadelphia Phillies.

External links

References

Catholic secondary schools in Iowa
Schools in Clinton County, Iowa
Roman Catholic Diocese of Davenport
Buildings and structures in Clinton, Iowa
Private middle schools in Iowa
Private elementary schools in Iowa
Private high schools in Iowa